This was the first edition of the event. Kurumi Nara won the title, defeating Klára Zakopalová in the final, 6–1, 4–6, 6–1.

Seeds

 Klára Zakopalová (final)
 Francesca Schiavone (first round)
 Paula Ormaechea (quarterfinals)
 Alexandra Cadanțu (first round)
 Kurumi Nara (champion)
 María Teresa Torró Flor (first round)
 Barbora Záhlavová-Strýcová (first round)
 Vania King (first round)

Draw

Finals

Top half

Bottom half

Qualifying

Seeds

Qualifiers

Draw

First qualifier

Second qualifier

Third qualifier

Fourth qualifier

Fifth qualifier

Sixth qualifier

References

 Main Draw
 Qualifying Draw

Rio Open - Women's Singles
Rio
Rio Open